Ratgal is a village in Thanesar tehsil of Kurukshetra district in Haryana State, India. It belongs to Ambala Division. Ratgal's pin code is 136118.

Nearby villages 
 Thanesar
 Ladwa
 Taraori
 Shahbad

References

Villages in Kurukshetra district